Celtic Woman: A Celtic Christmas is an album by the group Celtic Woman, released on 25 November 2011. This album was released exclusively in Germany.

Performers in A Celtic Christmas are vocalists Chloë Agnew, Lisa Kelly, Lisa Lambe, Órla Fallon, Méav Ní Mhaolchatha, Lynn Hilary,  and fiddler Máiréad Nesbitt. Most songs were taken from previous releases (Celtic Woman: A Christmas Celebration and Celtic Woman: Lullaby), and this album is the third Christmas-themed one to be released by the group. New songs in this album include An Angel and There Must Be An Angel, as well as two live recordings from the Helix Theatre, Dublin, Ireland.

Track listing

Charts

References

Celtic Woman albums
2011 albums
Manhattan Records albums